Barrington Akeem Pryce (born 14 August 1993) is a Jamaican international footballer who plays for Tivoli Gardens, as a defender.

Career
Pryce has played club football for Tivoli Gardens and Rivoli United.

He made his international debut for Jamaica in 2018.

References

1993 births
Living people
Jamaican footballers
Jamaica international footballers
Tivoli Gardens F.C. players
Rivoli United F.C. players
National Premier League players
Association football defenders